The fifth season of Degrassi: The Next Generation commenced airing in Canada on 19 September 2005, concluded on 20 March 2006 and contains nineteen episodes. Degrassi: The Next Generation is a Canadian serial teen drama television series. This season depicts the lives of a group of high school sophomores, juniors and seniors as they deal with some of the challenges and issues teenagers face such as body image, teenage pregnancy, drug dealing, coming out, sexual identity, religion, eating disorders and relationships. 

Filming took place between May 2005 and November 2005.

Season five aired Mondays at 8:30 p.m. on CTV, a Canadian terrestrial television network. In the United States, it was broadcast on the Noggin cable channel during its programming block for teenagers, The N. The season was released on DVD as a four disc boxed set on 3 July 2007 by Alliance Atlantis Home Entertainment in Canada, and by FUNimation Entertainment in the US. The season is also available on iTunes. The N Soundtrack was released on 1 August 2006, following this season.

The fifth season of Degrassi: The Next Generation was the most successful season to date, averaging 767,000 viewers in Canada, and had one episode watched by a million viewers. It received praise for its depiction of a relationship between two gay characters, but mixed reviews for highlighting the issue of anorexia and bulimia in teenage girls.

Cast

Main cast
 Lauren Collins as Paige Michalchuk (15 episodes)
 Cassie Steele as Manuela "Manny" Santos (14 episodes)
 Ryan Cooley as James Tiberius "J.T." Yorke (14 episodes)
 Jake Goldsbie as Toby Isaacs (14 episodes)
 Adamo Ruggiero as Marco Del Rossi (14 episodes)
 Miriam McDonald as Emma Nelson (13 episodes)
 Aubrey Graham as Jimmy Brooks (13 episodes)
 Stefan Brogren as Archie "Snake" Simpson (13 episodes)
 Sarah Barrable-Tishauer as Liberty Van Zandt (13 episodes)
 Melissa DiMarco as Daphne Hatzilakos (13 episodes)
 Andrea Lewis as Hazel Aden (11 episodes)
 Jake Epstein as Craig Manning (11 episodes)
 Stacey Farber as Ellie Nash (10 episodes)
 Shane Kippel as Gavin "Spinner" Mason (10 episodes)
 Jamie Johnston as Peter Stone (10 episodes)
 Deanna Casaluce as Alex Nuñez (9 episodes)
 Shenae Grimes as Darcy Edwards (8 episodes)
 Mike Lobel as Jay Hogart (7 episodes)
 Amanda Stepto as Christine "Spike" Nelson (6 episodes)
 Pat Mastroianni as Joey Jeremiah (4 episodes)
 Stacie Mistysyn as Caitlin Ryan (1 episode)

Recurring cast
 Marc Donato as Derek Haig (6 episodes)
 Linlyn Lue as Ms. Laura Kwan (5 episodes)
 Dalmar Abuzeid as Danny Van Zandt (5 episodes)
 Caroline Park as Kim (5 episodes)
 Nicola Correia-Damude as Diane (4 episodes)
 Jajube Mandiela as Chantay Black (3 episodes)
 Michael Kinney as Coach Darryl Armstrong (3 episodes)
 Roy Lewis as Mr. Harold Van Zandt (3 episodes)
 Arlene Duncan as Mrs. Van Zandt (3 episodes)
 Alex House as Tim (3 episodes)
 Melissa McIntyre as Ashley Kerwin (2 episodes)
 Marie V. Cruz as Mrs. Julietta Santos (2 episodes)
 Von Flores as Mr. Joseph Santos (2 episodes)
 Ted Whittall as Dr. Andras (2 episodes)
 Tom Melissis as Mr. Dom Perino (2 episodes)
 Alexa Steele as Angela Jeremiah (2 episodes)
 Anne Anglin as Mrs. Cooney (2 episodes)
 Mark Wilson as The Landlord (2 episodes)
 David Bolt as Mr. McKay (2 episodes)
 Ishan Davé as Linus (2 episodes)
 Ashley Newbrough as Melinda (2 episodes)
 Tony Munch as Chad Kent (2 episodes)
 Debra Lynne McCabe as Emily Nuñez (2 episodes)
 Jason Mewes as Himself/Jay (2 episodes)
 Kevin Smith as Himself/Silent Bob  (2 episodes)
 Bobby D. Freeman as Mr. Ellis (2 episodes)

Guest stars
 Linda Kash as Bernice Fein (1 episode)
 Jeannie Calleja as Bernice's Assistant (1 episode)
 Hayley Lochner as Jenn (1 episode)
 David Sazant as Loser Drunk Guy (1 episode)
 Austin MacDonald as Neighbour (1 episode)
 Christopher Jacot as Matt Oleander (1 episode)
 Julie Khaner as Elizabeth (1 episode)
 Talia Schlanger as University Rep #1 (1 episode)
 Adrian Proszowski as University Rep #2 (1 episode)
 Ben Hunter as University Rep #3 (1 episode)
 Genelle Williams as Mia (1 episode)
 Terrence Bryant as Dr. Jim (1 episode)
 Courtney Wells as Katherine (1 episode)
 Lara Fenton as Random Girl (1 episode)
 Conrad Coates as Mr. Jemaine Brooks (1 episode)
 Zahf Paroo as Coach Morris (1 episode)
 James Donohue as Ted (1 episode)
 Jennifer Podemski as Ms. Chantel Sauvé (1 episode)
 Bobby Manning as Floor Director (1 episode)
 Caroline Tsuruda as Megan (1 episode)
 Libby Adams as Madison (1 episode)
 Paul Robbins as Aaron (1 episode)
 Tony Sciara as Mr. Del Rossi (1 episode)
 Brona Brown as Mrs. Louisa Del Rossi (1 episode)
 Michael Colonnese as Bully (1 episode)
 Christopher Huron as Stage Manager (1 episode)
 Alanis Morissette as herself (1 episode)
 Jung-Yul Kim as Bouncer (1 episode)
 Tanya Kim as herself (1 episode)
 Miranda Jade as Hot Chick (1 episode)
 Money Money as themselves (1 episode)
 Alan Van Sprang as Leo Davies (1 episode)
 John-Philip Vazaquez as Photographer (1 episode)
 Rachel Puchkoff as Angry Teen (1 episode)
 Cathy Keenan as Liz O'Rourke (1 episode)
 Brian Bisson as Stripper Chef (1 episode)
 John Bregar as Dylan Michalchuk (1 episode)
 Laurence Anthony as Antoine (1 episode)
 Adam Korson as Male Customer (1 episode)
 Lisa Berry as Theatre Manager (1 episode)

Crew
The season was produced by Epitome Pictures in association with CTV. Funding was provided by The Canadian Film or Video Production Tax Credit and the Ontario Film and Television Tax Credit, the Canadian Television Fund and BCE-CTV Benefits, The Shaw Television Broadcast Fund, the Independent Production Fund, Mountain Cable Program, and RBC Royal Bank.

The executive producers were Epitome Pictures' president Stephen Stohn, and CEO Linda Schuyler, the co-creator of the Degrassi franchise. James Hurst served as the creative producer, David Lowe was the line producer and Sean Reycraft served as the executive story editor. Brendon Yorke and Alexandra Zarowny served as story editors. The editor was Stephen Withrow, Stephen Stanley was the production designer, and the cinematographer was Gavin Smith. The writers for the season are Avra Fein, James Hurst, Aaron Martin, Miklos Perlus, Sean Reycraft, Shelley Scarrow, Brendon Yorke and Alexandra Zarowny. Phil Earnshaw, Eleanore Lindo, Ron Oliver and Stefan Scaini directed the episodes.

Reception
The fifth season of Degrassi: The Next Generation had an audience average of 767,000 viewers, had an increase of twenty-four per cent over the previous season, and was Canada's most watched Canadian drama series. The second episode of the season was watched by over one million Canadian viewers; it was the first time the series had reached that figure.

A two-part episode, aired to coincide with the Canadian National Eating Disorder Awareness Week, earned mixed reviews. Laura Betker of the Winnipeg Sun said "Thankfully, the show moves far away from the health-class ideal that anorexia and bulimia simply stem from self-conscious teens. Rather, it displays it as the ugly disease that it truly is... All aspects of the story were done well. The plot was realistic. The display of the disease was truthful and progressive, while the acting was at an all time high... Miriam McDonald's performance was phenomenal. [She] performs with strength and credibility." Bill Harris of the Toronto Sun criticized the episodes' "ham-fisted handling of anorexia" and wrote: "It’s just that, well, the Degrassi foray, while well-intentioned, leaves you hungry for a fresh insight, some relevant information, a compelling storyline, good writing, believable dialogue, anything." Harris even went as far as saying, "That Degrassi episode was so bad it made me want to throw up."

Other storylines were well received, however. AfterElton.com, a website which focuses on the portrayal of homosexual and bisexual men in the media, and owned by MTV Networks' Logo cable television network, reported on the portrayal of two Degrassi: The Next Generation gay characters. "Degrassi features ongoing stories of real-life teen dilemmas—including intense gay and lesbian storylines—and does it without the righteous, 'On a Very Special Blossom''' endings that many teen dramas and sitcoms thrive on." The Gonzaga Bulletin'', the student newspaper for Gonzaga University in Spokane, Washington, reported on the show's popularity amongst its students.

Despite being well received by audiences and the generally good reviews, season five received only two nominations for awards. At the Gemini Awards, Jim McGrath won the category for "Best Original Music Score for a Dramatic Series". The younger members of the cast were nominated for a Young Artist Award in the "Best Young Ensemble Performance in a TV Series (Comedy or Drama)" category.

Episodes
In a change to previous seasons, CTV broadcast episodes one and two over two weeks, as opposed to an hour-long special. In the United States, Noggin's "The N" block aired the episodes as an hour-long special on 7 October 2005. The N proceeded to broadcast the next ten episodes, and then put the season on hiatus until 7 April 2006, when it returned with another hour-long special.

DVD release
The DVD release of season five was released by Alliance Atlantis Home Entertainment in Canada, and by FUNimation Entertainment in the US on 3 July 2007 after it had completed broadcast on television.  As well as every episode from the season, the DVD release features bonus material including deleted scenes, bloopers and behind-the-scenes featurettes.

References

External links
Season 5 episode synopses at CTV Television Network
 List of Degrassi: The Next Generation episodes at IMDB.

Degrassi: The Next Generation seasons
2005 Canadian television seasons
2006 Canadian television seasons